R14, R-14 or R.14 may refer to:

Military 
 Caudron R.14, a French experimental biplane fighter
 Firestone XR-14, a proposed American helicopter
 R-14 Chusovaya, a Soviet ballistic missile
 , a submarine of the United States Navy

Roads 
 R14 road (Ghana)
 R-14 regional road (Montenegro)

Other uses 
 R14 (New York City Subway car)
 R14 (Rodalies de Catalunya), a regional rail line in Catalonia, Spain
 Carbon tetrafluoride, a refrigerant
 Nkumbi language
 R14: Reacts violently with water, a risk phrase
 R14 battery, a dry cell
 Renault 14, a French compact car